Bostwick is a town in Morgan County, Georgia, United States. As of the 2020 census, the city had a population of 378.

History
Bostwick was incorporated by the Georgia General Assembly in 1902. The community was named in honor of John Bostwick, a founding resident.

Geography
Bostwick is located in northern Morgan County at  (33.737220, -83.514957). Georgia State Route 83 passes through the town, leading south  to Madison, the county seat, and northwest  to Monroe.

Bostwick is drained to the north by Bucks Creek, a tributary of Jacks Creek, and to the south by Beaverdam Creek, a tributary of Big Sandy Creek. The entire town is part of the Apalachee River watershed, flowing to the Oconee River.

Demographics

As of the census of 2000, there were 322 people, 125 households, and 88 families residing in the town. The racial makeup of the town was 81.37% White and 18.63% African American. Hispanic or Latino of any race were 0.31% of the population.

There were 125 households, out of which 29.6% had children under the age of 18 living with them, 60.0% were married couples living together, 7.2% had a female householder with no husband present, and 28.8% were non-families. 26.4% of all households were made up of individuals, and 11.2% had someone living alone who was 65 years of age or older.  The average household size was 2.58 and the average family size was 3.16.

In the town, the population was spread out, with 24.2% under the age of 18, 5.9% from 18 to 24, 33.2% from 25 to 44, 23.3% from 45 to 64, and 13.4% who were 65 years of age or older.  The median age was 38 years. For every 100 females, there were 90.5 males.  For every 100 females age 18 and over, there were 95.2 males.

The median income for a household in the town was $39,464, and the median income for a family was $56,667. Males had a median income of $30,000 versus $28,750 for females. The per capita income for the town was $19,005.  About 5.7% of families and 7.5% of the population were below the poverty line, including 4.8% of those under age 18 and 16.3% of those age 65 or over.

References

Towns in Morgan County, Georgia
Towns in Georgia (U.S. state)